Jim Wilson was a Scottish footballer who played in the Football League for Bolton Wanderers.

References

Date of birth unknown
Date of death unknown
Scottish footballers
English Football League players
Association football forwards
Ayr Parkhouse F.C. players
Bolton Wanderers F.C. players
Millwall F.C. players
FA Cup Final players